Çatalsu is a village in the Gülağaç District, Aksaray Province, Turkey. Its population is 280 (2021). Its distance to Gülağaç is 17 km and to Aksaray is 35 km.

References

Villages in Gülağaç District